Günther Beck is a West German former slalom canoeist who competed in the 1950s and the 1960s. He won a gold medal in the C1 team event at the 1957 ICF Canoe Slalom World Championships in Augsburg.

References

German male canoeists
Possibly living people
Year of birth missing (living people)